Sukumar Barua (born 5 January 1938) is a Bangladeshi rhymester. He was awarded Ekushey Padak by the Government of Bangladesh in 2017.

Career
Barua worked at Institute of Nutrition and Food Science at the University of Dhaka.

Awards
 Janakantha Pratibha Sammanana (1998)
 Shabdapat Medal (2006)
 Kabir Chowdhury Shishu Sahitya Puraskar (2010)
 Odommo Chattagram Award (2012)
 Agrani Bank - Bangladesh Shishu Academy Shishu Sahitya Puraskar (2013)
 Ekushey Padak (2017)

References

Living people
1938 births
People from Chittagong
Bangladeshi lyricists
Bangladeshi Buddhists
Recipients of the Ekushey Padak